Anastasius I of Antioch was the Patriarch of Antioch twice (561–571 and 593–599).

Alban Butler calls him "a man of singular learning and piety". He was a friend of Pope Gregory I, and aroused the enmity of the Emperor Justinian by opposing certain imperial doctrines about the Body of Christ (Justinian favoured the Aphthartodocetae). He was to be deposed from his see and exiled when Justinian died; but Justin II carried out his uncle's purpose five years later in 570, and another bishop, Gregory of Antioch, was put in his place.  But when Gregory died in 593, Anastasius was restored to his see. This was chiefly due to Pope Gregory the Great, who interceded with the Emperor Maurice and his son Theodosius, asking that Anastasius be sent to Rome, if not reinstated at Antioch.

From some letters sent to him by Gregory, it is thought that he was not sufficiently vigorous in denouncing the claims of the Patriarch of Constantinople to be a universal bishop.

There is some confusion about the date of his death. According to some sources, he was killed by a Jewish mob in 599. His feast day is 21 April. An alternative version is that Anastasius died in 598, and was succeeded by another bishop by the same name, to whom the translation of Gregory's Regula Pastoralis is attributed, and who is recorded as having been put to death in an insurrection of the Jews. However, Nicephorus (Hist. Eccl., XVIII, xliv) declares that these two are one and the same person.

The same difficulty occurs with regard to certain Sermones de orthodoxa fide, some ascribing them to the latter Anastasius; others claiming that there was but one bishop of that name.

At the Second Council of Nicaea, a letter of Anastasius was read, in which he drew the distinction between the worship due to God, and the respect which is rendered to men and angels, viz., that we serve God alone.

References

Sources

External links
 http://www.santiebeati.it/dettaglio/50130

599 deaths
Year of birth missing
Greek Orthodox Patriarchs of Antioch
Saints from Anatolia
6th-century Byzantine bishops
7th-century Christian saints
6th-century Byzantine writers
6th-century archbishops